The Islington Workhouse was constructed by the West London Union in 1864-5 in Upper Holloway.

References

Workhouses in London
Former buildings and structures in London
Buildings and structures completed in 1865